Liz Cruz (born 21 July 1985) is a former Salvadoran tennis player.

Cruz has a WTA singles career high ranking of 805 achieved on 26 April 2004. She also has a WTA doubles career high ranking of 656 achieved on 12 April 2004.

Playing for El Salvador in Fed Cup, Cruz has a W/L record of 14–11.

ITF finals (0–2)

Doubles (0–2)

Fed Cup participation

Singles

References

External links 
 
 
 

1985 births
Living people
Salvadoran female tennis players
Central American and Caribbean Games bronze medalists for El Salvador
Central American and Caribbean Games medalists in tennis
Tennis players at the 2003 Pan American Games
Pan American Games competitors for El Salvador
21st-century Salvadoran women